Genedata is a Swiss-headquartered bioinformatics company that provides enterprise software that support large-scale, experimental processes in life science research. The company focuses on automating data-rich, highly complex data workflows in biopharmaceutical R&D. It continuously develops and markets interoperable software that together comprises the Genedata Biopharma Platform.

Almost all the world's top 50 biopharmaceutical companies, including some of the most innovative R&D organizations developing groundbreaking therapies in fields such as cancer immunology, cell & gene therapy and vaccines, license at least one component of the Genedata Biopharma Platform. The company is headquartered in Basel, Switzerland with subsidiaries and offices in Germany, the United Kingdom, the United States, Singapore, and Japan.

Products 
Genedata software captures, processes, and analyzes experimental data and drives the automation of complex experimental setups.  The Genedata Biopharma Platform is a product portfolio comprising two main types of software products: 
Genedata Data Analysis Systems
Genedata Workflow Systems

Genedata Expressionist
Streamlines biopharma mass spectrometry workflows across instruments and organizations.

Genedata Imagence
Automates high-content screening image analysis workflows based on a deep learning approach.

Genedata Screener
Captures, analyzes, and manages all screening data—automating even complex assays.

Genedata Selector
Streamlines NGS-based workflows from cell line development to biosafety.

Genedata Workflow Systems provide a backbone for managing R&D processes.

Genedata Biologics
Transforms discovery of biotherapeutics including mAbs, bispecifics, ADCs, TCRs, and CAR T cells.

Genedata Bioprocess
Designs manufacturing processes for cell line development, upstream and downstream processing, formulation, and analytics.

Genedata Profiler
Breaks down data silos and fosters data-informed decisions for successful clinical trials.

Genedata has been developing these platforms since 1997 and continues to develop its products, providing up to four software releases per year for each product to its customers under a software subscription license model. Services also offered include hosting under a Software as a Service (SaaS) model, operational IT services, integration and software customization, support and maintenance, as well as training and process consulting services.

Industries 
Genedata has a presence in research & development laboratories, where large quantities of complex experimental data are generated. Within the biopharmaceutical industry, Genedata collaborates with biopharma organizations and biotechnology companies. Genedata also works with leading agriscience and other life science organizations that address nutritional and health-related challenges. Contract research organizations (CROs) and academic research institutions also use Genedata software and services.

Sites 
Its offices are located in: 
Switzerland: Basel (headquarters)
Germany: Munich
Japan: Tokyo
Singapore
United Kingdom: Cambridge
United States: Boston and San Francisco

See also
Bioinformatics companies
Laboratory informatics
Life sciences
Visual analytics

References

Bioinformatics companies
Research support companies
Software companies of Switzerland
Companies established in 1997